The 2018 United States Senate election in West Virginia took place on November 6, 2018, to elect a member of the United States Senate to represent the State of West Virginia, concurrently with other elections to the United States Senate, elections to the United States House of Representatives, and various state and local elections.

On May 8, 2018, the Republican primary voters of the state nominated West Virginia Attorney General Patrick Morrisey as the Republican candidate. In the general election, incumbent Democratic Senator Joe Manchin defeated Morrisey and was elected to a second full term, albeit by a margin much narrower than that of his victory in 2012.

Background
West Virginia was once a Democratic stronghold at the state and federal level, but has been rapidly shifting towards the Republican Party since 2000. In 2008, John McCain defeated Barack Obama by a margin of 55–42%.

In the 2012 presidential election, Mitt Romney defeated Obama 62–35% and swept every single county in the state. Despite this, Manchin was reelected in his own landslide over perennial candidate John Raese, receiving more than 60% of the vote and carrying all but three counties.

In 2016, Donald Trump won the state by a greater than 40-point margin over Hillary Clinton (68–26%), with Clinton's performance being the worst for either party in the state's history. Trump also won every county in the state.

Concurrent with Trump's landslide victory in the West Virginia, Democratic businessman Jim Justice won the gubernatorial election with 49% of the vote but changed his party affiliation back to Republican within a year (Justice had previously been a Republican prior to running as a Democrat for governor). Democrats lost almost every statewide office in the state in 2016, with State Treasurer John Perdue being the only statewide Democrat reelected. Perdue lost reelection in 2020, making Manchin the only Democratic statewide officeholder in the state.

Because of the heavy Republican lean of his state, Manchin was ranked by many outlets as one of the most vulnerable incumbents up for reelection. President Trump headlined three rallies in the state on behalf of Manchin's opponent, Patrick Morrisey. Manchin's vote to confirm Judge Brett Kavanaugh in his highly contentious confirmation hearing, making him the only Democrat to do so, garnered national attention and backlash from members of his own party just weeks before the midterm elections.

Democratic primary

Candidates

Nominee
 Joe Manchin, incumbent U.S. Senator

Eliminated in primary
 Paula Jean Swearengin, social and environmental activist

Endorsements

Polling

Results

Republican primary

Candidates

Nominee
 Patrick Morrisey, Attorney General of West Virginia

Eliminated in the primary
 Don Blankenship, former chairman and CEO of Massey Energy
 Bo Copley, coal miner
 Evan Jenkins, U.S. Representative
 Jack Newbrough, truck driver and navy veteran
 Tom Willis, army veteran

Declined
 Ryan Ferns, Majority Leader of the West Virginia Senate (running for reelection)
 David McKinley, U.S. Representative (running for reelection)
 Alex Mooney, U.S. Representative (running for reelection)

Endorsements

Debates

Polling

Results

Libertarian Party

Candidates

Nominated 

 Rusty Hollen

Constitution Party

Candidates

Denied ballot access
 Don Blankenship, former chairman and CEO of Massey Energy. Observers noted that he would be ineligible to run due to West Virginia's sore-loser law which states that the loser of a partisan primary election cannot appear on the ballot as an independent or with another political party in the general election. Blankenship was eligible to run as a write-in candidate. Secretary of State Mac Warner denied ballot access to Blankenship's campaign on July 26, citing West Virginia's "sore loser" law. After a lawsuit, the Supreme Court of Appeals of West Virginia ordered Warner to deny Blankenship ballot access on August 29, 2018.

Endorsements

General election

Candidates
 Mark Brazaitis (Independent, write-in), author and deputy mayor of Morgantown, West Virginia

Predictions

Endorsements

Fundraising

Polling

with Don Blankenship

with generic Republican
{| class="wikitable"
|- valign=bottom
! Poll source
! Date(s)administered
! Samplesize
! Marginof error
! style="width:100px;"| JoeManchin (D)
! style="width:100px;"| GenericRepublican
! Undecided
|-
| National Research Inc. (R-GOPAC)
| align=center| April 17–19, 2018
| align=center| –
| align=center| –
| align=center| 37%
|  align=center| 41%
| align=center| 20%
|-
| SurveyMonkey/Axios
| align=center| February 12 – March 5, 2018
| align=center| 1,591
| align=center| ± 3.5%
| align=center| 43%
|  align=center| 52%
| align=center| 5%

with Evan Jenkins
{| class="wikitable"
|- valign=bottom
! Poll source
! Date(s)administered
! Samplesize
! Marginof error
! style="width:100px;"| JoeManchin (D)
! style="width:100px;"| EvanJenkins (R)
! Undecided
|-
| Zogby Analytics
| align=center| September 27–30, 2017
| align=center| 320
| align=center| ± 5.5%
|  align=center| 49%
| align=center| 36%
| align=center| 15%
|-
| Research America Inc.
| align=center| August 11–20, 2017
| align=center| 400
| align=center| ± 4.9%
|  align=center| 50%
| align=center| 40%
| align=center| 10%
|-
| Harper Polling
| align=center| November 16–17, 2016
| align=center| 500
| align=center| ± 4.4%
|  align=center| 51%
| align=center| 39%
| align=center| 10%

with Alex Mooney
{| class="wikitable"
|- valign=bottom
! Poll source
! Date(s)administered
! Samplesize
! Marginof error
! style="width:100px;"| JoeManchin (D)
! style="width:100px;"| AlexMooney (R)
! Undecided
|-
| Zogby Analytics
| align=center| September 27–30, 2017
| align=center| 320
| align=center| ± 5.5%
|  align=center| 49%
| align=center| 35%
| align=center| 17%
|-
| Harper Polling
| align=center| November 16–17, 2016
| align=center| 500
| align=center| ± 4.4%
|  align=center| 58%
| align=center| 28%
| align=center| 14%

with David McKinley

with generic Democratic and Republican

with Carte Goodwin
{| class="wikitable"
|- valign=bottom
! Poll source
! Date(s)administered
! Samplesize
! Marginof error
! style="width:100px;"| CarteGoodwin (D)
! style="width:100px;"| AlexMooney (R)
! Undecided
|-
| Harper Polling
| align=center| November 16–17, 2016
| align=center| 500
| align=center| ± 4.4%
|  align=center| 41%
| align=center| 31%
| align=center| 28%

{| class="wikitable"
|- valign=bottom
! Poll source
! Date(s)administered
! Samplesize
! Marginof error
! style="width:100px;"| CarteGoodwin (D)
! style="width:100px;"| EvanJenkins (R)
! Undecided
|-
| Harper Polling
| align=center| November 16–17, 2016
| align=center| 500
| align=center| ± 4.4%
| align=center| 31%
|  align=center| 43%
| align=center| 25%

Results

Results by county
All results are from the office of the Secretary of State of West Virginia.

Counties that flipped from Democratic to Republican

 Barbour (largest municipality: Philippi)
 Berkeley (largest municipality: Martinsburg)
 Calhoun (largest municipality: Grantsville)
 Clay (largest municipality: Clay)
 Gilmer (largest municipality: Glenville)
 Hampshire (largest municipality: Romney)
 Hancock (largest municipality: Weirton)
 Hardy (largest municipality: Moorefield)
 Jackson (largest municipality: Ravenswood)
 Lewis (largest municipality: Weston)
 Logan (largest municipality: Logan)
 Mercer (largest municipality: Bluefield)
 Mineral (largest municipality: Keyser)
 Mingo (largest municipality: Williamson)
 Monroe (largest municipality: Peterstown)
 Morgan (largest municipality: Berkeley Springs)
 Nicholas (largest municipality: Summersville)
 Pendleton (largest municipality: Franklin)
 Pleasants (largest municipality: St. Marys)
 Pocahontas (largest municipality: Marlinton)
 Raleigh (largest municipality: Beckley)
 Ritchie (largest municipality: Harrisville)
 Taylor (largest municipality: Grafton)
 Tucker (largest municipality: Parsons)
 Tyler (largest municipality: Paden City)
 Upshur (largest municipality: Buckhannon)
 Webster (largest municipality: Webster Springs)
 Wirt (largest municipality: Elizabeth)
 Wyoming (largest municipality: Mullens)

References

External links
Candidates at Vote Smart
Candidates at Ballotpedia
Campaign finance at FEC
Campaign finance at OpenSecrets

Official campaign websites
Don Blankenship (C) for Senate (write-in)
Mark Brazaitis (I) for Senate (write-in)
Rusty Hollen (L) for Senate
Joe Manchin (D) for Senate
Patrick Morrisey (R) for Senate 

2018
West Virginia
2018 West Virginia elections